Jinzhou is a town and the seat of Jinzhou City in southern Hebei province, China. , it has 43 villages under its administration.

See also
List of township-level divisions of Hebei

References

Township-level divisions of Hebei